Tomorrow's Daughter is the thirteenth studio album by alternative rock musician Matthew Sweet. It was released on May 18, 2018 under Sweet's Honeycomb Hideout, a label under Sony Music.

Critical reception
Tomorrow's Daughter was met with generally favorable reviews from critics. At Metacritic, which assigns a weighted average rating out of 100 to reviews from mainstream publications, this release received an average score of 73, based on 5 reviews.

Track listing

Charts

References

2018 albums
Matthew Sweet albums
Albums produced by Matthew Sweet